Since the election of 27 April 1994, South Africa has been divided into nine provinces. They vary widely in population density, from the highly urbanized Gauteng with nearly 700 people per square kilometre, to the mostly-desert Northern Cape with less than four people per square kilometre. The following table shows the provincial population density according to the Statistics South Africa Census.

Historical data

Since the creation of the current provinces in 1994 there have been three censuses, in 1996, 2001 and 2011.

See also
 List of South African provinces by population
 List of South African provinces by area

References

population density
South African provinces by population density
provinces by population density
South African provinces